SUD (pronounced sōōd) is an indie rock/jazz fusion band from the Philippines. The band is composed of Sud Ballecer on vocals and guitar, Jimbo Cuenco on drums, Carlos de la Fuente on saxophone, Kohl Aguilar on keyboard, and Raisa Racelis on bass.

They are currently signed in Warner Music Philippines label, a division of Warner Music Group.

The band is popularly known for their hit singles "Smilky", "Profanities", "Make U Say", and "Sila", they also covered OPM Rock classic Kitchie Nadal's 2004 hit rock song Huwag Na Huwag Mong Sasabihin in 2018.

Band members

Current
 Gesmund "Sud" Ballecer - vocals
 Raisa Racelis - bass
 Jimbo Cuenco - drums
 Carlos de la Fuente - saxophone
 Kohl Aguilar - keyboard

Former
 Gelo Acosta (Rhythm Guitar, Backing Vocals)
 Marc Reyes (Bass)
 Chii Balanaa (Guitar)

Discography

Studio albums

Singles
 "Smilky"
 "Profanities"
 "Make U Say"
 "Sila"
 "Show Me"
 "Di Makatulog"
 "Huwag Na Huwag Mong Sasabihin (Original By Kitchie Nadal)
 "Headlights"
 "Baliw"
 "Sana Bumalik"
 "Sagutan"
 "Dumaloy"

References

Filipino rock music groups
Musical groups from Manila
Musical groups established in 2012
Warner Music Philippines artists
2012 establishments in the Philippines